List of winners and nominees of the César Award for Best Supporting Actor.

History

Superlatives

List of winners and nominees

1970s

1980s

1990s

2000s

2010s

2020s

Multiple awards and nominations

The following individuals received two or more Best Supporting Actor awards: 

The following individuals received three or more Best Supporting Actor nominations:

Fabrice Luchini has the record of most consecutive nominations with three (1993, 1994, 1995). Eight actors have 2 consecutive nominations: Guy Marchand (1981, 1982), Vincent Pérez (1998, 1999), Jamel Debbouze (2002, 2003), Clovis Cornillac (2004, 2005), Dany Boon (2006, 2007), Niels Arestrup (2010, 2011), Louis Garrel (2015, 2016) and Laurent Lafitte (2017, 2018).

References

Adapted from the article César Award for Best Actor in a Supporting Role, from Wikinfo, licensed under the GNU Free Documentation License.

See also
Academy Award for Best Supporting Actor
BAFTA Award for Best Supporting Actor

External links 
 Official website 
 César Award for Best Supporting Actor at AlloCiné

Actor in supporting role
Film awards for supporting actor